Amjad Hussain Azar is a Pakistani politician who is currently opposition leader of the Gilgit Baltistan Assembly.

Political career
Azar contested 2020 Gilgit-Baltistan Assembly election on 15 November 2020 from constituency GBA-1 (Gilgit-I) and GBA-4 (Nagar-I) on the ticket from Pakistan Peoples Party candidate. He won GBA-1 (Gilgit-I) by the margin of 3,393 votes over the Independent runner up Sultan Raees. He garnered 10,875 votes while Raees received 7,482 votes. He won GBA-4 (Nagar-I) by the margin of 498 votes over the runner up Muhammad Ayub Waziri of Islami Tehreek Pakistan. He garnered 6,104 votes while Waziri received 5,606 votes.
On 30 November 2020, He was elected as leader of Opposition of Giligit Baltistan Assembly.

References

Living people
Gilgit-Baltistan MLAs 2020–2025
Politicians from Gilgit-Baltistan
Year of birth missing (living people)